Princess Anne (born 1950) is the daughter of Queen Elizabeth II and Prince Philip, Duke of Edinburgh.

Princess Anne may also refer to:

British royals
Anne Hyde (1637–1671), Duchess of York as daughter-in-law of Charles I
Anne Neville (1456–1485), Princess of Wales (1470–1471) as daughter-in-law of Henry VI
Anne of York (daughter of Edward IV) (1475–1511)
Anne Stuart (1637–1640), daughter of Charles I
Anne, Princess Royal and Princess of Orange (1709–1759), daughter of George II
Anne, Queen of Great Britain (1665–1714), daughter of James II, known as Princess Anne of Denmark between marriage and accession to the throne

Danish princesses
Anne of Denmark (1574–1619), queen consort of James VI of Scotland and I of England
Anne of Denmark, Electress of Saxony (1532–1585), Danish princess from the House of Oldenburg
Princess Anne of Denmark (1917–1980), wife of Prince George Valdemar of Denmark

Places
Princess Anne County, Virginia, now extinct
Princess Anne, Maryland, US
Princess Anne, Virginia, US, formerly known as Princess Anne County before incorporating as a city

Other uses
 46202 Princess Anne, a steam locomotive
Princess Anne High School, Virginia Beach, Virginia

See also
Anna of Austria (disambiguation)
Queen Anne (disambiguation)